Chris Salewicz is a journalist, broadcaster and novelist who lives in London.
He was as a senior features writer for the  New Musical Express from 1975 to 1981, where under tutelage of editor Neil Spencer he and other journalists were said to have re-written the book on music journalism. The period Chris spent at NME is regarded by some as a 'Golden Age of Music Journalism', where, fuelled by the punk rock explosion, the whole genre changed into a complex revolutionary socioeconomic critique rather than the fan club–style journalism of the previous decades. Along with other NME alumni (notably Tony Parsons and Julie Burchill) of that period, Chris's work soon found its way into serious mainstream publications the Sunday Times, the Independent, The Daily Telegraph, Conde Nast Traveller, Q, Mojo and Time Out; he also wrote for The Face magazine.

Salewicz's time at the NME helped him forge a unique relationship and friendship with two men who would reshape music in the 1970s, 1980s and 1990s: Joe Strummer (of the Clash) and Bob Marley. His journeys with these two men—from Trenchtown Ghetto and Jamaican Gun Court to Zimbabwean independence, and from Maida Vale Squat to Groucho Club to the search for Garcia Lorca's bones in Andalucía—continued to redefine music journalism. As his subject's influence expanded beyond  musical spheres, Salewicz's writing and subsequent books on Joe Strummer (Redemption Song) and Bob Marley (The Untold Story) would also expand beyond the music into what made Strummer and Marley political and cultural icons.

In 1995, he and film director Don Letts moved to Jamaica for two years to develop film ideas. Drawing on extensive research, Salewicz embarked on the writing of Third World Cop, the most successful film ever in the Caribbean when it was released in 1999.

Salewicz is the author of fifteen books, including the acclaimed Rude Boy: Once Upon a Time in Jamaica; Redemption Song: the Definitive Biography of Joe Strummer, which is an exhaustive, epic biography of the Clash frontman; and Bob Marley: The Untold Story. He was the on-screen narrator in 2010's , a documentary feature film—a cinematically released documentary in Poland—about how Polish rock and roll helped bring down communism. The same year, Salewicz went into Tivoli Gardens in Kingston to report on the "Dudus affair" for The Wall Street Journal.

Notes
 The Guardian article on The Golden Age of Music Journalism 
Kraków Post (Beats of Freedom)   
The New York Times 
Sabotage Times 
Blogcritics 
The Wall Street Journal 
The Independent

References

External links 
 
 

British male journalists
British writers
Living people
Year of birth missing (living people)